The Lockheed Martin F-22 Raptor is an American single-seat, twin-engine, all-weather stealth tactical fighter aircraft developed for the United States Air Force (USAF). As the result of the USAF's Advanced Tactical Fighter (ATF) program, the aircraft was designed as an air superiority fighter, but also has ground attack, electronic warfare, and signals intelligence capabilities. The prime contractor, Lockheed Martin, built most of the F-22's airframe and weapons systems and conducted final assembly, while Boeing provided the wings, aft fuselage, avionics integration, and training systems.

The aircraft first flew in 1997 and was variously designated F-22 and F/A-22 before it formally entered service in December 2005 as the F-22A. Although the USAF had originally planned to buy a total of 750 ATFs, the program was cut to 187 operational aircraft in 2009 due to high costs, a lack of air-to-air missions due to the military's focus on counterinsurgency operations at the time of production, a ban on exports, and development of the more affordable and versatile F-35; the last F-22 was delivered in 2012.

While it had a protracted development and initial operational difficulties, the F-22 has become a critical component of the USAF's tactical airpower. The fighter's combination of stealth, aerodynamic performance, and mission systems enabled a great leap in air combat capabilities and set the benchmark for its generation. The F-22 is expected to serve into the 2030s and eventually be succeeded by the USAF's Next Generation Air Dominance (NGAD) manned fighter component.

Development

Origins

In 1981, the U.S. Air Force identified a requirement for an Advanced Tactical Fighter (ATF) to replace the F-15 Eagle and F-16 Fighting Falcon. Code-named "Senior Sky", this air-superiority fighter program was influenced by emerging worldwide threats, including new developments in Soviet air defense systems and the proliferation of the Sukhoi Su-27 "Flanker"- and Mikoyan MiG-29 "Fulcrum"-class of fighter aircraft. It would take advantage of the new technologies in fighter design on the horizon, including composite materials, lightweight alloys, advanced flight control systems and avionics, more powerful propulsion systems, and most importantly, stealth technology. In 1983, the ATF concept development team became the System Program Office (SPO) and managed the program at Wright-Patterson Air Force Base. The demonstration and validation (Dem/Val) request for proposals (RFP) was issued in September 1985, with requirements placing a strong emphasis on stealth and supercruise. Owing to the immense investments required to develop the technology needed to achieve performance goals, teaming between companies was encouraged. Of the seven bidding companies, Lockheed and Northrop were selected on 31 October 1986. Lockheed, through its Skunk Works division, then teamed with Boeing and General Dynamics while Northrop teamed with McDonnell Douglas, and the two contractor teams undertook a 50-month Dem/Val phase, culminating in the flight test of two technology demonstrator prototypes, the YF-22 and the YF-23, respectively. Concurrently, Pratt & Whitney and General Electric were awarded contracts to develop the YF119 and YF120 engines respectively for the ATF engine competition.

Dem/Val was focused on system engineering, technology development plans, and risk reduction over point aircraft designs; in fact, after the down-select, the Lockheed team completely changed the airframe configuration in the summer of 1987 due to weight analysis during detailed design, with notable changes including the wing planform from swept trapezoidal to diamond-like delta and a reduction in forebody planform area. Contractors made extensive use of analytical and empirical methods, including computational fluid dynamics, wind-tunnel testing, and radar cross-section (RCS) calculations and pole testing; the Lockheed team would conduct nearly 18,000 hours of wind-tunnel testing. Avionics development was marked by extensive testing and prototyping and supported by ground and flying laboratories. During Dem/Val, the SPO used the results of performance and cost trade studies conducted by contractor teams to adjust ATF requirements and delete ones that were significant weight and cost drivers while having marginal value. The short takeoff and landing (STOL) requirement was relaxed to delete thrust-reversers, saving substantial weight. As avionics was a major cost driver, side-looking radars were deleted, and the dedicated infra-red search and track (IRST) system was downgraded from multi-color to single color and then deleted as well. Space and cooling provisions were retained to allow for the later addition of these components. The ejection seat requirement was downgraded from a fresh design to the existing McDonnell Douglas ACES II.

Each team produced two prototype air vehicles for Dem/Val, one for each of the two engine options. The YF-22 had its maiden flight on 29 September 1990 and in-flight tests achieved up to Mach 1.58 in supercruise. After the Dem/Val flight test of the prototypes, on 23 April 1991, Secretary of the USAF Donald Rice announced the Lockheed team and Pratt & Whitney as the winners of the ATF and engine competitions. The YF-23 design was considered stealthier and faster, while the YF-22, with its thrust vectoring nozzles, was more maneuverable as well as less expensive and risky. The press speculated that the Lockheed team's design was also more adaptable to the U.S. Navy's Navalized Advanced Tactical Fighter (NATF), but by fiscal year (FY) 1992, the Navy had abandoned NATF.

Production and procurement
As the program moved to full-scale development, or Engineering & Manufacturing Development (EMD), the production F-22 design had notable differences from the YF-22, despite having a similar configuration. The wing's leading edge sweep angle was decreased from 48° to 42°, while the vertical stabilizers were shifted rearward and decreased in area by 20%. The radome shape was changed for better radar performance and the wingtips were clipped for antennas. To improve pilot visibility and aerodynamics, the canopy was moved forward  and the engine inlets moved rearward . The shapes of the fuselage, wing, and stabilator trailing edges were refined to improve aerodynamics, strength, and stealth characteristics. The production airframe was designed with a service life of 8,000 hours. Increasing weight during EMD caused slight reductions in projected range and maneuver performance.

Aside from advances in air vehicle and propulsion technology, the F-22's avionics and software were unprecedented in terms of complexity and scale, with the fusion of multiple sensors systems and software integration of 1.7 million lines of code. To enable early looks and troubleshooting for mission software development, a Boeing 757 was modified with F-22 mission systems to serve as the Flying Test Bed avionics laboratory.

The end of the Cold War and the dissolution of the Soviet Union in 1991 reduced the Department of Defense's (DoD) urgency for new weapon systems and the following years would see reductions in DoD spending; this resulted in the F-22's EMD being rescheduled and lengthened multiple times. The roughly equal division of work amongst the team largely carried through from Dem/Val to EMD, although prime contractor Lockheed acquired General Dynamics' fighter portfolio at Fort Worth, Texas in 1993 and thus had the majority of the airframe manufacturing. While Lockheed Martin Aeronautics primarily performed Dem/Val work at its Skunk Works sites in Burbank and Palmdale, California, it would shift the program office and EMD work from Burbank to Marietta, Georgia, where it performed final assembly; program partner Boeing provided additional airframe components as well as avionics integration and training systems in Seattle, Washington. The first F-22, an EMD aircraft with tail number 4001, was unveiled at Dobbins Air Reserve Base in Marietta on 9 April 1997 and first flew on 7 September 1997. In 2006, the F-22 development team won the Collier Trophy, American aviation's most prestigious award.

The USAF originally envisioned ordering 750 ATFs at a total program cost of $44.3 billion and procurement cost of $26.2 billion in FY 1985 dollars, with production beginning in 1994 and service entry in the late 1990s. The 1990 Major Aircraft Review led by Secretary of Defense Dick Cheney reduced this to 648 aircraft beginning in 1996 and in service in the early-to-mid 2000s. After the end of the Cold War, this was further curtailed to 442 in the 1993 Bottom-Up Review while the USAF eventually set its requirement to 381 to adequately support its Air Expeditionary Force structure. However, funding instability had reduced the total to 339 by 1997 and again to 277 by 2003. In 2004, with its focus on asymmetric counterinsurgency warfare in Iraq and Afghanistan, the DoD under Secretary Donald Rumsfeld further cut the planned procurement to 183 operational aircraft, despite the USAF's requirement for 381. A multi-year procurement plan was implemented in 2006 to save $15 billion, with total program cost projected to be $62 billion for 183 F-22s distributed to seven combat squadrons. In 2008, Congress passed a defense spending bill that raised the total orders for production aircraft to 187. Production, with the first lot awarded in September 2000, supported over 1,000 subcontractors and suppliers from 46 states and up to 95,000 jobs, and spanned 15 years at a peak rate of roughly two airplanes per month.

The first two F-22s built were EMD aircraft in the Block 1.0 configuration for initial flight testing and envelope expansion, while the third was a Block 2.0 aircraft built to represent the internal structure of production airframes and enabled it to test full flight loads. Six more EMD aircraft were built in the Block 10 configuration for development and upgrade testing, with the last two considered essentially production quality jets. Production for operational squadrons consisted of 74 Block 10/20 training aircraft and 112 Block 30/35 combat aircraft; one of the Block 30 aircraft is dedicated to flight sciences at Edwards Air Force Base, California. Block 20 aircraft from Lot 3 onward were upgraded to Block 30 standards, increasing the Block 30/35 fleet to 149 aircraft while 37 remain in the Block 20 configuration.

The numerous new technologies in the F-22 resulted in substantial cost overruns and delays. Many capabilities were deferred to post-service upgrades, reducing the initial cost but increasing total program cost. Due to the aircraft's sophisticated capabilities, contractors have been targeted by cyberattacks and technology theft. As production wound down in 2011, the total program cost is estimated to be about $67.3 billion (about $360 million for each operational aircraft delivered), with $32.4 billion spent on Research, Development, Test and Evaluation (RDT&E) and $34.9 billion on procurement and military construction (MILCON) in then year dollars. The incremental cost for an additional F-22 was estimated at $138 million in 2009.

Ban on exports

The F-22 cannot be exported under US federal law to protect its stealth technology and classified features. Customers for U.S. fighters are acquiring earlier designs such as the F-15 Eagle and F-16 Fighting Falcon or the newer F-35 Lightning II, which contains technology from the F-22 but was designed to be cheaper, more flexible, and available for export. In September 2006, Congress upheld the ban on foreign F-22 sales. Despite the ban, the 2010 defense authorization bill included provisions requiring the DoD to report on the costs and feasibility for an F-22 export variant, and another report on the effect of F-22 export sales on the US aerospace industry.

Some Australian politicians and defense commentators proposed that Australia should attempt to purchase F-22s instead of the planned F-35s, citing the F-22's known capabilities and F-35's delays and developmental uncertainties. The Royal Australian Air Force (RAAF) soon determined that the F-22 was unable to perform the F-35's strike and close air support roles.

The Japanese government also showed interest in the F-22 for its Replacement-Fighter program. The Japan Air Self-Defense Force (JASDF) would reportedly require fewer fighters for its mission if it obtained the F-22, thus reducing engineering and staffing costs. In 2009 it was reported that acquiring the F-22 would require increases to the Japanese government's defense budget beyond the historical 1 percent of its GDP. With the end of F-22 production, Japan chose the F-35 in December 2011. Israel also expressed interest, but eventually chose the F-35 because of the F-22's price and unavailability.

Production termination
Throughout the 2000s when the Department of Defense was primarily fighting counterinsurgency wars in Iraq and Afghanistan, the USAF's procurement goal of 381 F-22s was questioned over rising costs, initial reliability and availability problems, limited multirole versatility, and a lack of relevant adversaries for air combat missions. In 2006, Comptroller General of the United States David Walker found that "the DoD has not demonstrated the need" for more investment in the F-22, and further opposition was expressed by Bush Administration Secretary of Defense Rumsfeld and his successor Robert Gates, Deputy Secretary of Defense Gordon R. England, and Chairman of U.S. Senate Armed Services Committee (SASC) Senators John Warner and John McCain. Under Rumsfeld, procurement was severely cut to 183 aircraft. The F-22 lost influential supporters in 2008 after the forced resignations of Secretary of the Air Force Michael Wynne and the Chief of Staff of the Air Force General T. Michael Moseley. In November 2008, Gates stated that the F-22 lacked relevance in asymmetric post-Cold War conflicts, and in April 2009, under the Obama Administration, he called for production to end in FY 2011 after completing 187 F-22s.

The loss of staunch F-22 advocates in the upper DoD echelons resulted in the erosion of its political support. In July 2008, General James Cartwright, Vice Chairman of the Joint Chiefs of Staff, stated to the SASC his reasons for supporting the termination of F-22 production, including shifting resources to the multi-service F-35 and preserving the F/A-18 production line for the EA-18G Growler's electronic warfare capabilities. Although Russian and Chinese fighter developments fueled concern for the USAF, Gates dismissed this and in 2010, he set the F-22 requirement to 187 aircraft by lowering the number of major regional conflict preparations from two to one, despite an effort by Moseley's successor General Norton Schwartz to raise the number to 243. After President Barack Obama threatened to veto further production at Gates' urging, the Senate voted in July 2009 in favor of ending production and the House agreed to abide by the 187 cap. Gates highlighted the F-35's role in the decision, and in 2011, he explained that Chinese fighter developments had been accounted for when the F-22 numbers were set, and that the U.S. would have a considerable advantage in stealth aircraft in 2025 even with F-35 delays. In December 2011, the 195th and final F-22 was completed out of 8 test EMD and 187 operational aircraft produced; the jet was delivered on 2 May 2012. The curtailed procurement would force the USAF to operate the F-15C/D into the 2020s in order to retain adequate numbers of air superiority fighters.

Although production ended, F-22 tooling was retained for the possibility of a production restart or a Service Life Extension Program (SLEP). A RAND Corporation paper from a 2010 USAF study estimated that restarting production and building an additional 75 F-22s would cost $17 billion, resulting in $227 million per aircraft, $54 million higher than the flyaway cost. At that time, Lockheed Martin stated that restarting the production line itself would cost about $200 million. Production tooling and associated documentation were subsequently stored at the Sierra Army Depot to support the fleet life cycle while its Marietta plant space was repurposed to support the C-130J and F-35; engineering work for sustainment and upgrades continued at Fort Worth, Texas and Palmdale, California.

In April 2016, the House Armed Services Committee (HASC) Tactical Air and Land Forces Subcommittee, citing advances in air warfare systems of Russia and China, directed the USAF to conduct a cost study and assessment associated with resuming production of the F-22. On 9 June 2017, the USAF submitted their report to Congress stating they had no plans to restart the F-22 production line due to economic and logistical challenges; it estimated it would cost approximately $50 billion to procure 194 additional F-22s at a cost of $206–216 million per aircraft, including approximately $9.9 billion for non-recurring start-up costs and $40.4 billion for aircraft procurement costs with the first delivery in the mid-to-late 2020s. The long time gap since the end of production meant hiring new workers and sourcing replacement vendors, contributing to the high start-up costs and lead times. The USAF believed that the funding would be better invested in its next-generation Air Superiority 2030 effort, which evolved into the Next Generation Air Dominance.

Upgrades
The F-22 and its subsystems were designed to be upgraded over its life cycle. The modernization and upgrades consist of software and hardware modifications, or Tactical Mandates, captured under numbered Increments, originally called Spirals, as well as software-only Operational Flight Program (OFP) Updates. Amid debates over the airplane's relevance in asymmetric counterinsurgency warfare, the first Increments and OFP Updates primarily focused on ground attack, or strike capabilities. Increment 2, the first upgrade program, was implemented in 2005 for Block 20 aircraft onward and enabled the employment of Joint Direct Attack Munitions (JDAM). The improved AN/APG-77(V)1 radar, which incorporates air-to-ground modes, was certified in March 2007 and fitted on airframes from Lot 5 onward. Increment 3.1 and Updates 3 and 4 for Block 30/35 aircraft improved ground-attack capabilities through synthetic aperture radar mapping and radio emitter direction finding, electronic attack and Small Diameter Bomb (SDB) integration; testing began in 2009 and the first upgraded aircraft was delivered in 2011. To address oxygen deprivation issues, F-22s were fitted with an automatic backup oxygen system (ABOS) and modified life support system starting in 2012.

In contrast to prior upgrades, Increment 3.2 for Block 30/35 aircraft emphasized air combat capabilities and was a two-part process. 3.2A focused on electronic warfare, communications and identification, while 3.2B included geolocation improvements and full integration of the AIM-9X and AIM-120D; fleet releases began in 2013 and 2019, respectively. Concurrent with Increment 3.2, Update 5 in 2016 added automatic ground collision avoidance system (GCAS), datalink updates, and more. Update 6, deployed in tandem with 3.2B, incorporated cryptographic and avionics stability enhancements. Following 3.2B, an open mission system (OMS) processor module and architecture were added and an agile software development process was implemented to enable faster enhancements from additional vendors. The Multifunctional Information Distribution System-Joint Tactical Radio System (MIDS-JTRS) for Mode 5 IFF and Link 16 traffic was installed starting in 2021, and the airplane can also use the Battlefield Airborne Communications Node (BACN) as a two-way communication gateway.

Additional modernization and enhancements are under development, with funding currently extending to 2031; upgrades currently being tested include new sensors and antennas, long range advanced infrared search and track (AIRST), and more durable stealth coatings. Other enhancements being developed include all-aspect IRST functionality for the Missile Launch Detector (MLD), manned-unmanned teaming capability, and cockpit improvements. The planned Multifunction Advanced Data Link (MADL) integration was cut due to development delays and lack of proliferation among USAF platforms. Although the Thales Scorpion helmet-mounted cuing system (HMCS) was successfully tested on the F-22 in 2013, funding cuts delayed its deployment. Lockheed Martin has proposed upgrading all Block 20 training aircraft to Block 30/35 in order to increase numbers available for combat. The F-22 has also been used to test technology for its eventual successor from the Next Generation Air Dominance (NGAD) program; some advances are expected to be applied to the F-22 as well.

Aside from capability upgrades, the F-22 fleet underwent a $350 million "structures retrofit program" to address improper titanium heat treatment in the parts of certain airframe batches. By January 2021, all aircraft had gone through the Structural Repair Program to ensure full lifetimes for all aircraft. In the long term, the F-22 is expected to eventually be succeeded by the NGAD's sixth-generation manned fighter component.

Design

Overview

The F-22 Raptor is a fifth-generation air superiority fighter that is considered fourth generation in stealth aircraft technology by the USAF. It is the first operational aircraft to combine supercruise, supermaneuverability, stealth, and sensor fusion in a single weapons platform. The F-22 has clipped diamond-like delta wings blended into the fuselage with four empennage surfaces and leading edge root extensions running to the upper outboard corner of the caret inlets. Flight control surfaces include leading-edge flaps, flaperons, ailerons, rudders on the canted vertical stabilizers, and all-moving horizontal tails (stabilators); for speed brake function, the ailerons deflect up, flaperons down, and rudders outwards to increase drag. The aircraft has a refueling boom receptacle centered on its spine and retractable tricycle landing gear as well as an emergency tailhook.

The aircraft's dual Pratt & Whitney F119 augmented turbofan engines are closely spaced and incorporate pitch-axis thrust vectoring nozzles with a range of ±20 degrees; the nozzles are fully integrated into the F-22's flight controls and vehicle management system. Each engine has maximum thrust in the 35,000 lbf (156 kN) class. The F-22's thrust-to-weight ratio at typical combat weight is nearly at unity in maximum military power and 1.25 in full afterburner. The caret inlets generate oblique shocks with the upper inboard corners to ensure good total pressure recovery and efficient supersonic flow compression. Maximum speed without external stores is approximately Mach 1.8 at military power and greater than Mach 2 with afterburners.

The F-22's high cruise speed and operating altitude over prior fighters improve the effectiveness of its sensors and weapon systems, and increase survivability against ground defenses such as surface-to-air missiles. The ability to supercruise, or sustain supersonic flight without using afterburners, allows it to intercept targets that afterburner-dependent aircraft would lack the fuel to reach. The use of internal weapons bays permits the aircraft to maintain comparatively higher performance over most other combat-configured fighters due to a lack of parasitic drag from external stores. Its structure contains a significant amount of high-strength materials to withstand stress and heat of sustained supersonic flight. Respectively, titanium alloys and bismaleimide/epoxy composites comprise 42% and 24% of the structural weight.

The F-22's aerodynamics, relaxed stability, and powerful thrust-vectoring engines give it excellent maneuverability and energy potential across its flight envelope. The airplane has excellent high alpha (angle of attack) characteristics, capable of flying at trimmed alpha of over 60° while maintaining roll control and performing maneuvers such as the Herbst maneuver (J-turn) and Pugachev's Cobra. The flight control system and full-authority digital engine control (FADEC) make the aircraft highly departure resistant and controllable, thus giving the pilot carefree handling.

Avionics

The aircraft has an integrated avionics system where through sensor fusion, data from all onboard sensor systems as well as off-board inputs are filtered and processed into a combined tactical picture, thus enhancing the pilot's situational awareness and reducing workload. Key mission systems include Sanders/General Electric AN/ALR-94 electronic warfare system, Martin Marietta AN/AAR-56 infrared and ultraviolet Missile Launch Detector (MLD), Westinghouse/Texas Instruments AN/APG-77 active electronically scanned array (AESA) radar, TRW Communication/Navigation/Identification (CNI) suite, and long range advanced IRST currently being tested. The F-22's baseline software has some 1.7 million lines of code, the majority involving the mission systems such as processing radar data. The integrated nature of the avionics, as well as the use of Ada, has made the development and testing of upgrades challenging. To enable more rapid upgrades, the avionics suite added an open mission systems (OMS) processor, as well as an open-source architecture called the Open Systems Enclave (OSE) to enable the use of containerized software from third-party vendors.

The F-22's ability to operate close to the battlefield gives the aircraft threat detection and identification capability comparative with the RC-135 Rivet Joint, and the ability to function as a "mini-AWACS", though its radar is less powerful than those of dedicated platforms. This allows the F-22 to rapidly designate targets for allies and coordinate friendly aircraft. Data can be transferred to other aircraft through a BACN or via Link 16 using MIDS-JTRS. The IEEE 1394B bus developed for the F-22 was derived from the commercial IEEE 1394 "FireWire" bus system. In 2007, the F-22's radar was tested as a wireless data transceiver, transmitting data at 548 megabits per second and receiving at gigabit speed, far faster than the Link 16 system. The radio frequency receivers of the electronic support measures (ESM) system give the aircraft the ability to perform intelligence, surveillance, and reconnaissance (ISR) tasks.

The APG-77 radar has a low-observable, active-aperture, electronically scanned antenna with multiple target track-while-scan in all weather conditions; radar emissions can also be focused to overload enemy sensors as an electronic-attack capability. The upgraded APG-77(V)1 provides air-to-ground functionality through synthetic aperture radar mapping and strike modes. Alongside the radar is the ALR-94 electronic warfare system, among the most technically complex equipment on the F-22, that integrates more than 30 antennas blended into the wings and fuselage for all-round radar warning receiver (RWR) coverage and threat geolocation. It can be used as a passive detector capable of searching targets, with range (250+ nmi) exceeding the radar's, and can provide enough information for a radar lock and cue emissions to a narrow beam (down to 2° by 2° in azimuth and elevation). Depending on the detected threat, the defensive systems can prompt the pilot to release countermeasures such as flares or chaff. The MLD uses six sensors to provide full spherical infrared coverage while the advanced IRST, housed in a stealthy pod on the wing, is a narrow field-of-view sensor for long-range passive identification and targeting. To ensure stealth in the radio frequency spectrum, CNI emissions are strictly controlled and confined to specific sectors, with tactical communication between F-22s performed using the directional Inter/Intra-Flight Data Link (IFDL). Radar and CNI information are processed by two Hughes Common Integrated Processor (CIP)s, each capable of processing up to 10.5 billion instructions per second. The aircraft has also been upgraded to incorporate an automatic ground collision avoidance system (GCAS).

Cockpit

The F-22 has a glass cockpit with all-digital flight instruments. The monochrome head-up display offers a wide field of view and serves as a primary flight instrument; information is also displayed upon six color liquid-crystal display (LCD) panels. The primary flight controls are a force-sensitive side-stick controller and a pair of throttles. The USAF initially wanted to implement direct voice input (DVI) controls, but this was judged to be too technically risky and was abandoned. The canopy's dimensions are approximately 140 inches long, 45 inches wide, and 27 inches tall (355 cm × 115 cm × 69 cm) and weighs 360 pounds. The canopy was redesigned after the original design lasted an average of 331 hours instead of the required 800 hours.

The F-22 has integrated radio functionality, the signal processing systems are virtualized rather than as a separate hardware module. The integrated control panel (ICP) is a keypad system for entering communications, navigation, and autopilot data. Two  up-front displays located around the ICP are used to display integrated caution advisory/warning (ICAW) data, CNI data and also serve as the stand-by flight instrumentation group and fuel quantity indicator. The stand-by flight group displays an artificial horizon, for basic instrument meteorological conditions. The  primary multi-function display (PMFD) is located under the ICP, and is used for navigation and situation assessment. Three  secondary multi-function displays are located around the PMFD for tactical information and stores management.

The ejection seat is a version of the ACES II commonly used in USAF aircraft, with a center-mounted ejection control. The F-22 has a complex life support system, which includes the onboard oxygen generation system (OBOGS), protective pilot garments, and a breathing regulator/anti-g (BRAG) valve controlling flow and pressure to the pilot's mask and garments. The pilot garments were developed under the Advanced Technology Anti-G Suit (ATAGS) project and protect against chemical/biological hazards and cold-water immersion, counter g-forces and low pressure at high altitudes, and provide thermal relief. Following a series of hypoxia-related issues, the life support system was consequently revised to include an automatic backup oxygen system and a new flight vest valve.

Armament

The F-22 has three internal weapons bays: a large main bay on the bottom of the fuselage, and two smaller bays on the sides of the fuselage, aft of the engine inlets; a small bay for countermeasures such as flares is located behind each side bay. The main bay is split along the centerline and can accommodate six LAU-142/A launchers for beyond-visual-range (BVR) missiles and each side bay has an LAU-141/A launcher for short-range missiles. The primary air-to-air missiles are the AIM-120 AMRAAM and the AIM-9 Sidewinder, with planned integration of the AIM-260 JATM. Missile launches require the bay doors to be open for less than a second, during which pneumatic or hydraulic arms push missiles clear of the aircraft; this is to reduce vulnerability to detection and to deploy missiles during high-speed flight. An internally mounted M61A2 Vulcan 20 mm rotary cannon is embedded in the airplane's right wing root with the muzzle covered by a retractable door. The radar projection of the cannon fire's path is displayed on the pilot's head-up display.

While capable of carrying weapons with GPS guidance such as JDAMs and SDBs, the F-22 cannot self-designate laser-guided weapons.

While the F-22 typically carries weapons internally, the wings include four hardpoints, each rated to handle . Each hardpoint can accommodate a pylon that can carry a detachable 600-gallon (2,270 L) external fuel tank or a launcher holding two air-to-air missiles; the two inboard hardpoints are "plumbed" for external fuel tanks. The two outboard hardpoints have since been dedicated to a pair of stealthy pods housing the IRST and mission systems. To preserve the aircraft's stealth while enabling additional payload and fuel capacity, stealthy external carriage has been investigated since the mid-2000s, with a low drag, low-observable 600-gallon external tank and pylon currently under development. The aircraft can jettison external tanks and non-stealthy stores and their attachments to restore its stealth and kinematic performance.

Stealth

The F-22 was designed to be highly difficult to detect and track by radar. Measures to reduce RCS include airframe shaping such as alignment of edges, internal carriage of weapons, fixed-geometry serpentine inlets and curved vanes that prevent line-of-sight of the engine faces and turbines from any exterior view, use of radar-absorbent material (RAM), and attention to detail such as hinges and pilot helmets that could provide a radar return. The F-22 was also designed to have decreased radio frequency emissions, infrared signature and acoustic signature as well as reduced visibility to the naked eye. The aircraft's flat thrust-vectoring nozzles reduce infrared emissions of the exhaust plume to mitigate the threat of infrared homing ("heat seeking") surface-to-air or air-to-air missiles. Additional measures to reduce the infrared signature include special topcoat and active cooling to manage the heat buildup from supersonic flight.

Compared to previous stealth designs like the F-117, the F-22 is less reliant on RAM, which are maintenance-intensive and susceptible to adverse weather conditions. Unlike the B-2, which requires climate-controlled hangars, the F-22 can undergo repairs on the flight line or in a normal hangar. The F-22 has a Signature Assessment System which delivers warnings when the radar signature is degraded and necessitates repair. While the F-22's exact RCS is classified, in 2009 Lockheed Martin released information indicating that from certain angles the airplane has an RCS of 0.0001 m2 or −40 dBsm – equivalent to the radar reflection of a "steel marble"; the aircraft can mount a Luneburg lens reflector to mask its RCS. Effectively maintaining the stealth features can decrease the F-22's mission capable rate to 62–70%.

The effectiveness of the stealth characteristics is difficult to gauge. The RCS value is a restrictive measurement of the aircraft's frontal or side area from the perspective of a static radar. When an aircraft maneuvers it exposes a completely different set of angles and surface area, potentially increasing radar observability. Furthermore, the F-22's stealth contouring and radar-absorbent materials are chiefly effective against high-frequency radars, usually found on other aircraft. The effects of Rayleigh scattering and resonance mean that low-frequency radars such as weather radars and early-warning radars are more likely to detect the F-22 due to its physical size. These are also conspicuous, susceptible to clutter, and have low precision. Additionally, while faint or fleeting radar contacts make defenders aware that a stealth aircraft is present, reliably vectoring interception to attack the aircraft is much more challenging. According to the USAF an F-22 surprised an Iranian F-4 Phantom II that was attempting to intercept an American UAV, despite Iran's assertion of having military VHF radar coverage over the Persian Gulf.

Beginning in 2021, the F-22 has been seen testing a new chrome-like surface coating. This highly polished surface appears to change color based on the viewer's orientation to the aircraft. It is speculated that the new coating will help to reduce the F-22's detectability by IRST and other infrared tracking systems and missiles. This coating has also been seen on some F-35 and F-117 test aircraft.

Maintenance
Each airplane requires a three-week packaged maintenance plan (PMP) every 300 flight hours. The stealth coatings of the F-22 were designed to be more robust and weather-resistant than those used in earlier stealth aircraft. However, early coatings failed against rain and moisture when F-22s were initially posted to Guam in 2009. The stealth system account for almost one third of maintenance, with coatings being particularly demanding; more durable coatings are being developed in order to reduce maintenance efforts. F-22 depot maintenance is performed at Ogden Air Logistics Complex at Hill AFB, Utah, and considerable care is taken during maintenance due to the limited attrition reserve aircraft numbers of the small fleet size.

F-22s were available for missions 63% of the time on average in 2015, up from 40% when the aircraft was introduced in 2005. Maintenance hours per flight hour was also improved from 30 early on to 10.5 by 2009, lower than the requirement of 12; man-hours per flight hour was 43 in 2014. When introduced, the F-22 had a Mean Time Between Maintenance (MTBM) of 1.7 hours, short of the required 3.0; this rose to 3.2 hours in 2012. By fiscal year 2015, the cost per flight hour was $59,116.

Operational history

Designation and testing

The YF-22 was originally given the unofficial name "Lightning II", from the World War II Lockheed P-38 Lightning fighter which persisted until the mid-1990s, when the USAF officially named the F-22 "Raptor". The "Lightning II" name was later given to the F-35. The aircraft was also briefly dubbed "SuperStar" and "Rapier". In September 2002, USAF changed the Raptor's designation to F/A-22, mimicking the Navy's McDonnell Douglas F/A-18 Hornet and intended to highlight a planned ground-attack capability amid debate over the aircraft's role and relevance. The F-22 designation was reinstated in December 2005, when the aircraft entered service.

The F-22 flight test program consisted of flight sciences and developmental testing (DT) by the 411th Flight Test Squadron at Edwards AFB, California and operational test and evaluation (OT&E) by the 422nd Test and Evaluation Squadron at Nellis AFB, Nevada. Flight testing began in 1997 with Raptor 4001, the first EMD F-22, and eight more EMD jets assigned to the 411th FLTS would participate in the test program under the Combined Test Force (CTF) at Edwards. The first two aircraft conducted envelope expansion testing such as flying qualities, air vehicle performance, propulsion, and stores separation. The third aircraft, the first to have production-level internal structure, tested flight loads, flutter, and JDAM separation, while two non-flying F-22s were built for testing static loads and fatigue. Subsequent EMD aircraft and the Boeing 757 FTB tested avionics, CNI, environmental qualifications, and observables, with the first combat-capable Block 3.0 software flying in 2001. Raptor 4001 was retired from flight testing in 2000 and subsequently sent to Wright-Patterson AFB for survivability testing, including live fire testing and battle damage repair training. Other retired EMD F-22s have been used as maintenance trainers.

The first production F-22 was delivered to the 422nd TES at Nellis in January 2003 for Initial Operational Test & Evaluation (IOT&E). Following a preliminary assessment, called OT&E Phase 1, IOT&E began in April 2004 and was completed in December of that year. This marked the successful demonstration of the jet's air-to-air mission capability, although it was also more maintenance intensive than expected. A Follow-On OT&E (FOT&E) in 2005 cleared the F-22's air-to-ground mission capability. Delivery of operational aircraft for pilot training at Tyndall AFB, Florida began in September 2003, and the first combat ready F-22 of the 1st Fighter Wing arrived at Langley AFB, Virginia in January 2005. As the F-22 was designed for upgrades throughout its lifecycle, the 411th FLTS and 422nd TES would respectively continue the DT/OT&E of these upgrades. The 411th FLTS' fleet was further augmented by a dedicated Block 30 F-22 test aircraft in 2010.

In August 2008, an unmodified F-22 of the 411th FLTS performed the first ever air-to-air refueling of an aircraft using synthetic jet fuel as part of a wider USAF effort to qualify aircraft to use the fuel, a 50/50 mix of JP-8 and a Fischer–Tropsch process-produced, natural gas-based fuel. In 2011, an F-22 flew supersonic on a 50% mixture of biofuel derived from camelina.

Training

The 43rd Fighter Squadron was reactivated in 2002 as the F-22 Formal Training Unit (FTU) for the type's basic course at Tyndall AFB. Following severe damage to the installation in the wake of Hurricane Michael in 2018, the squadron and its aircraft were relocated to nearby Eglin AFB; the storm had also damaged several F-22s, which were later repaired. The FTU and its aircraft were reassigned to the 71st Fighter Squadron at Langley AFB in 2023. To reduce operating costs and prolong the F-22's service life, some pilot training sorties are performed using flight simulators, while the T-38 Talon is used for adversary training. The advanced F-22 weapons instructor course at USAF Weapons School is conducted by the 433rd Weapons Squadron at Nellis AFB.

Introduction into service

In December 2005, the USAF announced that the F-22 had achieved Initial Operational Capability (IOC) with the 94th Fighter Squadron. The unit subsequently participated in Exercise Northern Edge in Alaska in June 2006 and Exercise Red Flag 07–1 at Nellis AFB in February 2007, where it demonstrated the F-22's greatly increased air combat capabilities when flying against Red Force Aggressor F-15s and F-16s and also refined operational tactics and employment.

The F-22 achieved Full Operational Capability (FOC) in December 2007, when General John Corley of Air Combat Command (ACC) officially declared the F-22s of the integrated active duty 1st Fighter Wing and Virginia Air National Guard 192d Fighter Wing fully operational. This was followed by an Operational Readiness Inspection (ORI) of the integrated wing in April 2008, in which it was rated "excellent" in all categories, with a simulated kill-ratio of 221–0.

Operational service

Following IOC and large-scale exercises, the F-22 flew its first homeland defense mission in January 2007. In November 2007, F-22s of 90th Fighter Squadron at Elmendorf AFB, Alaska, performed their first North American Aerospace Defense Command (NORAD) interception of two Russian Tu-95MS bombers. Since then, F-22s have also escorted probing Tu-160 bombers.

The F-22 was first deployed overseas in February 2007 with the 27th Fighter Squadron to Kadena Air Base in Okinawa, Japan. This first overseas deployment was initially marred by problems when six F-22s flying from Hickam AFB, Hawaii, experienced multiple software-related system failures while crossing the International Date Line (180th meridian of longitude). The aircraft returned to Hawaii by following tanker aircraft. Within 48 hours, the error was resolved and the journey resumed. Kadena would be a frequent rotation for F-22 units; they have also been involved in training exercises in South Korea and Malaysia.

Defense Secretary Gates initially refused to deploy F-22s to the Middle East in 2007; the type made its first deployment in the region at Al Dhafra Air Base in the UAE in 2009. In April 2012, F-22s have been rotating into Al Dhafra, less than 200 miles from Iran. In March 2013, the USAF announced that an F-22 had intercepted an Iranian F-4 Phantom II that approached within 16 miles of an MQ-1 Predator flying off the Iranian coastline.

On 22 September 2014, F-22s performed the type's first combat sorties by conducting some of the opening strikes of Operation Inherent Resolve, the American-led intervention in Syria; aircraft dropped 1,000-pound GPS-guided bombs on Islamic State targets near Tishrin Dam. Between September 2014 and July 2015, F-22s flew 204 sorties over Syria, dropping 270 bombs at some 60 locations. Throughout their deployment, F-22s conducted close air support (CAS) and also deterred Syrian, Iranian, and Russian aircraft from attacking U.S.-backed Kurdish forces and disrupting U.S. operations in the region. F-22s also participated in the U.S. strikes that defeated pro-government and Russian Wagner Group paramilitary forces near Khasham in eastern Syria on 7 February 2018. These strikes notwithstanding, the F-22's main role in the operation was conducting intelligence, surveillance and reconnaissance.

In late 2014, the USAF tested a rapid deployment concept involving four F-22s and one C-17 for support, first proposed in 2008 by two F-22 pilots. The goal was for the type to be able to set up and engage in combat within 24 hours. Four F-22s were deployed to Spangdahlem Air Base in Germany in August, Łask Air Base in Poland, and Ämari Air Base in Estonia in September 2015, to train with NATO allies.

In November 2017, F-22s operating alongside B-52s bombed opium production and storage facilities in Taliban-controlled regions of Afghanistan. In 2019, the F-22 cost US$35,000 per flight hour to operate.

On 4 February 2023, an F-22 of the 1st Fighter Wing shot down an alleged Chinese spy balloon within visual range off the coast of South Carolina at an altitude of 60,000 to 65,000 ft. The wreckage landed approximately 6 miles offshore and was subsequently secured by ships of the U.S. Navy and U.S. Coast Guard. F-22s shot down additional high-altitude objects near the coast of Alaska on 10 February and over Yukon on 11 February.

Operational problems
During the initial years of service, F-22 pilots experienced symptoms as a result of oxygen system issues that include loss of consciousness, memory loss, emotional lability and neurological changes as well as lingering respiratory problems and a chronic cough; the issues resulted in a four-month grounding in 2011. In August 2012, the DoD found that the BRAG valve, used to inflate the pilot's vest during high-g maneuvers, was defective and restricted breathing and the OBOGS (onboard oxygen generation system) unexpectedly reduced oxygen levels during high-g maneuvers. The Raptor Aeromedical Working Group had recommended several changes in 2005 to deal with the oxygen supply issues that were initially unfunded but received further consideration in 2012. The F-22 CTF and 412th Aerospace Medicine Squadron eventually determined that breathing restrictions were the root cause. The coughing symptoms were attributed to acceleration atelectasis from high g exposure and the OBOGS delivering excessive oxygen concentration at low altitudes. The presence of toxins and particles in some ground crew was deemed to be unrelated. Modifications to the life-support equipment and oxygen system allowed the distance and altitude flight restrictions to be lifted on 4 April 2013.

Variants
YF-22A – pre-production technology demonstrator for Advanced Tactical Fighter (ATF) demonstration/validation phase; two were built.
F-22A – single-seat production version, was designated F/A-22A in early 2000s.
F-22B – planned two-seat variant, cancelled in 1996 to save development costs with test aircraft orders converted to F-22A.
Naval F-22 variant – a planned carrier-borne variant of the F-22 with variable-sweep wings for the U.S. Navy's Navy Advanced Tactical Fighter (NATF) program to replace the F-14 Tomcat. Program was cancelled in 1991.

Proposed derivatives
The FB-22 was a proposed medium-range supersonic stealth bomber for the USAF. The design was projected to carry up to 30 Small Diameter Bombs to about twice the range of the F-22A. The FB-22 proposal appears to have been cancelled with the 2006 Quadrennial Defense Review and subsequent developments, in lieu of a larger subsonic bomber with a much greater range.

The X-44 MANTA, or multi-axis, no-tail aircraft, was a planned experimental aircraft based on the F-22 with enhanced thrust vectoring controls and no aerodynamic surface backup. The aircraft was to be solely controlled by thrust vectoring, without featuring any rudders, ailerons, or elevators. Funding for this program was halted in 2000.

In August 2018, Lockheed Martin proposed an F-22 derivative to the USAF and JASDF that would combine an improved F-22 airframe with the avionics and improved stealth coatings of the F-35. The proposal was not considered by the USAF, while JASDF doubted its merits due to cost and existing export restrictions.

Operators

The United States Air Force is the only operator of the F-22. As of August 2022, it has 183 aircraft in its inventory.

Frontline squadrons 
 1st Fighter Wing at Langley Air Force Base, Virginia
 27th Fighter Squadron
 94th Fighter Squadron
 71st Fighter Squadron (Training Unit, originally based at Tyndall Air Force Base with the 43rd FS, relocated after Hurricane Michael to Eglin, then to Langley.)
 3rd Wing at Joint Base Elmendorf–Richardson, Alaska
 90th Fighter Squadron
 525th Fighter Squadron
 15th Wing at Hickam Air Force Base, Hawaii
 19th Fighter Squadron (Pacific Air Forces associate unit)
 154th Wing at Hickam Air Force Base, Hawaii
 199th Fighter Squadron (Air National Guard unit)
 192nd Fighter Wing at Joint Base Langley–Eustis, Virginia
 149th Fighter Squadron (Air National Guard associate unit)
 325th Fighter Wing – Tyndall AFB, Florida
 44th Fighter Group – Tyndall AFB, Florida
 301st Fighter Squadron (Air Force Reserve Command associate unit)
 477th Fighter Group – Elmendorf AFB, Alaska
 302d Fighter Squadron (Air Force Reserve Command associate unit)

Test and Evaluation Squadrons 
 57th Wing at Nellis Air Force Base, Nevada
 422nd Test and Evaluation Squadron
 433rd Weapons Squadron
 412th Test Wing at Edwards Air Force Base, California
 411th Flight Test Squadron

Accidents

The first F-22 crash occurred during takeoff at Nellis AFB on 20 December 2004, in which the pilot ejected safely before impact. The investigation revealed that a brief interruption in power during an engine shutdown prior to flight caused a flight-control system malfunction; consequently the aircraft design was corrected to avoid the problem. Following a brief grounding, F-22 operations resumed after a review.

An Air Force Materiel Command investigation found that Cooley momentarily lost consciousness during a high-G maneuver, or g-LOC, then ejected when he found himself too low to recover. Cooley was killed during ejection by blunt-force trauma from windblast due to the aircraft's speed. The investigation found no design issues.

On 16 November 2010, an F-22 from Elmendorf AFB crashed, killing the pilot, Captain Jeffrey Haney. F-22s were restricted to flying below 25,000 feet, then grounded during the investigation. The crash was attributed to a bleed air system malfunction after an engine overheat condition was detected, shutting down the Environmental Control System (ECS) and OBOGS. The accident review board ruled Haney was to blame, as he did not react properly to engage the emergency oxygen system. Haney's widow sued Lockheed Martin, claiming equipment defects, and later reached a settlement. After the ruling, the emergency oxygen system engagement handle was redesigned; the system was eventually replaced by an automatic backup oxygen system (ABOS). On 11 February 2013, the DoD's Inspector General released a report stating that the USAF had erred in blaming Haney, and that facts did not sufficiently support conclusions; the USAF stated that it stood by the ruling.

During a training mission, an F-22 crashed to the east of Tyndall AFB, on 15 November 2012. The pilot ejected safely and no injuries were reported on the ground. The investigation determined that a "chafed" electrical wire ignited the fluid in a hydraulic line, causing a fire that damaged the flight controls.

On 15 May 2020, an F-22 from Eglin Air Force Base crashed during a routine training mission shortly after takeoff; the pilot ejected safely. The cause of the crash was attributed to a maintenance error after an aircraft wash resulting in faulty air data sensor readings.

Aircraft on display

 91-4002 — Hill Air Force Base Aerospace Museum in Ogden, Utah
 91-4003 — National Museum of the United States Air Force in Dayton, Ohio

Specifications (F-22A)

See also

Notes

References

Citations

Bibliography

 Aronstein, David C. and Michael J. Hirschberg. Advanced Tactical Fighter to F-22 Raptor: Origins of the 21st Century Air Dominance Fighter. Arlington, Virginia: American Institute of Aeronautics & Astronautics, 1998. .
 
 Jenkins, Dennis R., and Tony R. Landis. Experimental & Prototype U.S. Air Force Jet Fighters. North Branch, Minnesota: Specialty Press, 2008. .
 Miller, Jay. Lockheed Martin F/A-22 Raptor, Stealth Fighter. Hinckley, UK: Midland Publishing, 2005. .
 Pace, Steve. F-22 Raptor: America's Next Lethal War Machine. New York: McGraw-Hill, 1999. .
 Polmar, Norman. The Naval Institute Guide to the Ships and Aircraft of the U.S. Fleet. Annapolis, Maryland: Naval Institute Press, 2005. 
 Sweetman, Bill. "Fighter EW: The Next Generation". Journal of Electronic Defense, Volume 23, Issue 7, July 2000.

Further reading
 Holder, Bill, and Mike Wallace. Lockheed-Martin F-22 Raptor: An Illustrated History (Schiffer Military/Aviation History). Atglen, Pennsylvania: Schiffer Publishing, 1998. .

External links

 
 F-22 Demo at 2007 Capital Airshow in Sacramento – with narrative by F-22 pilot Paul "Max" Moga

F-022 Raptor
1990s United States fighter aircraft
Twinjets
Stealth aircraft
Articles containing video clips
Mid-wing aircraft
Aircraft first flown in 1997
Two dimension thrust vectoring aircraft